"New Flame" is a song recorded by American singer Chris Brown. It was originally released as a promotional single from Brown's album on March 5, 2014. This version only featured American rapper Rick Ross as a guest artist. A few months later, a day after the 2014 BET Awards were held, the single version of the song featuring Ross and American R&B singer Usher was released on June 30, 2014, as the fifth official single from his sixth studio album X. The song peaked at number 27 on the US Billboard Hot 100 and number 10 in the United Kingdom.

Music video
A music video for the song was released on August 14, 2014. Rapper Tyga makes a cameo appearance in the video.

The video starts with Chris Brown standing in a white location wearing white clothing. The visual then shows Brown standing in the front fire. Usher appears standing in a high large structure upon a pool with a girl wearing a red colored long dress. When the visual comes to rapper Rick Ross, he's shirtless in a white room and sitting in a white chair. The music video ends with Chris Brown and some dancers are dancing in the front of fire.

Chart performance
The single peaked at number 27 on the US Billboard Hot 100 chart and spent a total of 22 weeks on the chart. It also peaked at number six on the US Hot R&B/Hip-Hop Songs chart and spent 26 weeks on the chart. On November 10, 2017, the single was certified double platinum by the Recording Industry Association of America (RIAA) for combined sales and streaming equivalent units of over two million copies in the United States.

In the United Kingdom, the song peaked at number ten on the UK Singles Chart and only spent seven weeks on the chart. The single was certified Silver by the British Phonographic Industry (BPI) for sales of over 200,000 copies in the UK.

Track listing
Digital download
"New Flame"  – 4:04

Digital download (remix)
"New Flame" (Dave Audé Remix)  – 6:17

Charts

Weekly charts

Year-end charts

Certifications

References

External links
 

2014 singles
2014 songs
Chris Brown songs
Usher (musician) songs
Rick Ross songs
RCA Records singles
Songs written by Chris Brown
Songs written by Usher (musician)
Songs written by Rick Ross
Songs written by Eric Bellinger
Songs written by Verse Simmonds